Moshe Rudolf "Rudi" Bloch (2 August 1902 – 1985) was an Israeli scientist.

Biography
Born in 1902 in the city of Ústí nad Labem, Bohemia, Austria-Hungary, he received a PhD from the University of Bern. In 1926, he became head of the department of Metallography X-ray Spectrography at the Technische Hochschule in Karlsruhe in Germany. His activities included work on crystal nucleation and on refrigeration technology, as well as experiments on the prevention of super cooling of water.

In Israel, Bloch was responsible for researching and developing solar energy processes and products sourced from the Dead Sea and became head of the Negev Desert Research Institute. He became a very prominent man in Israeli solar energy.

Awards and honours
 In 1966, Bloch was awarded the Israel Prize in life sciences.
 In 1966, he also was awarded the Weizmann Institute of Science prize for science.   
 He held honorary positions at several of Israel's scientific and academic institutes.

Publications
Salt Mirror and Petroleum Formation

References

See also
List of Israel Prize recipients

Israeli scientists
Israel Prize in life sciences recipients
Members of the Israel Academy of Sciences and Humanities
Solar power in Israel
Czech Jews
20th-century Israeli Jews
1902 births
1985 deaths
Czechoslovak emigrants to Mandatory Palestine